John Lukas is an American poker player who has won two bracelets at the World Series of Poker.

He won his first bracelet in 1983, in the $1,000 Limit Razz event, earning $43,000.  Lukas won his second bracelet in 1985, in the $1,000 Limit Seven Card Stud Hi-Lo event, earning $74,500.

Since his victories at the WSOP, he has cashed in numerous poker tournaments, as well as playing in cash games.  Lukas came close to winning a third WSOP bracelet in 2005, when he finished as runner-up to Pat Poels in the $1,500 Limit Omaha Hi-Low Split 8 or Better event.  He also cashed in this event in the 2008 World Series of Poker.

As of 2009, Lukas's tournament earnings exceed $300,000, with $272,450 of those earnings being won at the World Series of Poker.

World Series of Poker Bracelets

References

American poker players
World Series of Poker bracelet winners
People from the Las Vegas Valley
Living people
Year of birth missing (living people)